Filmyard Holdings was an American pure holding company and is the former parent company of Miramax. Colony Capital and Qatar Investment Authority own the studio.  Rob Lowe is an investor in Colony's entertainment fund.

On December 3, 2010, Disney closed the sale of Miramax to Filmyard Holdings.   Investors put in $200 million in capital while raising $400 million in liabilities through Barclays PLC led group of banks.  Mike Lang, former business development executive at News Corporation, was selected as the CEO of Miramax, and the sale, estimated around US$663 million, included 700 film titles, as well as 90 book rights, 300 development projects and the "Miramax" name.   Additionally, Miramax came with $50 million in cash, $10 million in adjusted fees and two finished films ready for release. Don't Be Afraid of the Dark and The Debt were released in 2011 by FilmDistrict and Focus Features, respectively. Filmyard was content with generating revenue off Miramax's film library until Miramax was sold to beIN Media Group on March 2, 2016.

On January 22, 2013, Ron Tutor sold his stake to co-owner Qatar Investment Authority. Qatar's stake is reported by Variety as 75 percent.

See also
 List of Miramax films
 The Weinstein Company

References

Holding companies of the United States